Chloe Moran (born 16 November 1998) is an Australian track cyclist.

Moran is a Junior World Medallist, multiple National & Oceania Champion. She was a gold medalist at the 2022 Commonwealth Games in the  women's team pursuit.

References

 

1998 births
Living people
Australian female cyclists
Australian track cyclists
20th-century Australian people
Cyclists at the 2022 Commonwealth Games
Commonwealth Games gold medallists for Australia
20th-century Australian women
21st-century Australian women
Commonwealth Games medallists in cycling
Medallists at the 2022 Commonwealth Games